Benedetto Paconati (died 1445) was a Roman Catholic prelate who served as Bishop of Bagnoregio (1438–1445) and Bishop of Ario (1434–1438).

Biography
On 22 September 1434, Benedetto Paconati was appointed by Pope Eugene IV as Bishop of Ario.
On 10 January 1438, he was appointed by Pope Eugene IV as Bishop of Bagnoregio. He served as Bishop of Bagnoregio until his death in 1445.

While bishop, he served as the principal co-consecrator of Michael Padrolo, Bishop of Nemosia (1443); Johann Krewel, Bishop of Ösell (1443); and João Manuel, Bishop of Ceuta (1444).

References

External links and additional sources
 (for Chronology of Bishops)
 (for Chronology of Bishops)
 (for Chronology of Bishops) 
 (for Chronology of Bishops) 

15th-century Italian Roman Catholic bishops
1445 deaths
Bishops appointed by Pope Eugene IV